Buie may refer to:

 Buje or Buie, the Italian name of a town in Istria, Croatia
 Betel nut
 Boo Buie (born 1999), American basketball player
 Marc W. Buie, American astronomer